Les Lavandières du Portugal (The Washerwomen of Portugal) is a 1957 French film comedy directed by  Pierre Gaspard-Huit. It was produced by Les Films Univers, Société Pathé Cinéma and Suevia Films (Madrid), distributed by Pathé Consortium and developed by Laboratoire Franay L.T.C Saint-Cloud with montage by LAX. It was shot between 2 May and 6 June 1957 and released on 23 August that year.

Plot
Two companies are in fierce competition to carry out the publicity for the new American 'Floc' washing machine, with two teams led by Jean-François and Catherine. They both go to Portugal to try to tempt a jolly washerwoman to come to Paris to take part in the launch and both teams try to eliminate the competition. Catherine manages to find a suitable candidate, Mariana, but Jean-François manages to get her to follow him to Paris by offering to marry her.

Crew
 Director : Pierre Gaspard-Huit
 Director (Spanish version) : Ramon Torrado
 Screenplay: Jean Marsan, Madeleine Lefèvre
 Adaptation : Pierre Gaspard-Huit, Pierre Lary and Jean Marsan
 Dialogue : Jean Marsan
 Assistant Directors : Pierre Simon, Pierre Lary
 Music : André Popp
 Photography : Roger Fellous 
 Camera Operator : Maurice Fellous, assisted by Claude Lecomte and Claude Robin
 Sets : Roger Guisgand, assisted by Roger Briaucourt
 Editing : Fanchette Mazin, assisted by Simone du Bron
 Sound : René Sarazin, assisted by Jean Monchablon
 Makeup : Maurice Debanoff
 Landscape Photography : Henri Thibault
 Hair : Janine Pottier
 Costume (urban) : Designed by Alwyn
 Costume (regional) : Madame Samazeuil, after designs by Rodriguez Ferreira
 Costumes (bathing) : Port-Cros
 Location Manager : Roger Descoffre
 Location Manager (Exterior) : Roger Bar
 Producers: José Bénazéraf, Georges Glass and Cesáreo González	
 Production Director : Jean Velter, assisted by Marguerite Théoule
 Executive Producers : Pierre Cabaud and René Bézard

Cast
 Jean-Claude Pascal : Jean-François Aubray, publicitaire
 Anne Vernon : Catherine Deligny, la publicitaire rivale
 Paquita Rico : Mariana, la lavandière portugaise
 Darry Cowl : Paul, un aimable farfelu de génie, chef de l'Agence de Publicité Nouvelle  
 Jean-Marie Proslier : Marc, le photographe de Jean-François
 Marcel André : M. Dubois, le directeur de l'agence publicitaire OPI
 André Randall : André Molinié, le PDG des lessives Floc 
 Yvonne Monlaur : Nadine
 Carine Jansen : Maryse, l'assistante de Catherine
 Anne-Marie Baumann : L'actrice à la descente de l'avion
 Max Montavon : L'employé de la maison de disques
 Albert Michel : Le peintre qui chante dans le couloir
 Robert Le Béal : l'aubergiste
 Louis Massis : Le réalisateur de la "Pub"
 Germaine de France : Une dame de l'hôtel
 Jean-Pierre Jaubert : Un photographe
 Jean Droze : Le journaliste pour le lancement de la machine
 René Lefebvre-Bel : Le directeur à l'aéroport
 René Aranda: Un journaliste
 Marius Gaidon : Un journaliste
 Albert Daumergue : Un serveur
 Raymond Pierson : L'homme qui veut prendre l'ascenseur en panne  (uncredited)
 Aimé de March : Un homme à la réception
 Roger Lécuyer : Un homme à la réception
 Michel Montfort
 Erico Braga
 Patricio Alvares
 Jacques Debary
 André Badin
 Elga Andersen "Elga Hymmen" 
 Micheline Delanbre
 Michèle Frison
 Ellen Picard
 Jacqueline Fontel
 Barbara Brault
 Georges Sauval
 Pedro "Ignacio" Paul
 Georges Montant
 Manuel Requena
 José Borja
 Jean Marsan
 Liliane David
 Sylvie Solar

References

External links 
 https://www.imdb.com/title/tt0050626
 http://www.allocine.fr/film/fichefilm_gen_cfilm=45882.html
 http://cinema.encyclopedie.films.bifi.fr/index.php?pk=48723
  Posters - Unifrance

French comedy-drama films
Films shot in Portugal
1957 films
1950s French films